Henry James Church Jones (30 August 1870 – 18 January 1941) was a Church in Wales priest, most notably Archdeacon of Brecon from 1923 until 1939.

Church Jones was born at Aberporth and educated at Christ College, Brecon and St John's College, Oxford. He was ordained deacon in 1893, and priest in 1894. After a curacy in Brecon he was Vicar of Battle from 1904 to 1919; and a Canon at Brecon Cathedral from 1919 to 1923.

References

1870 births
1941 deaths
Archdeacons of Brecon
People educated at Christ College, Brecon
Alumni of St John's College, Oxford
20th-century Welsh Anglican priests
People from Ceredigion